Dabro is a Croatian surname. Notable people with the surname include:

 Ante Dabro (born 1938), Australian sculptor of Croatian origin
 Marko Dabro (born 1997), Croatian footballer

Croatian surnames